Kowloon Walled City was an ungoverned and densely populated de jure Imperial Chinese enclave within the boundaries of Kowloon City, British Hong Kong. Originally a Chinese military fort, the walled city became an enclave after the New Territories were leased to the United Kingdom by China in 1898. Its population increased dramatically following the Japanese occupation of Hong Kong during World War II. By 1990, the walled city contained 50,000 residents within its  borders. From the 1950s to the 1970s, it was controlled by local triads and had high rates of prostitution, gambling, and drug abuse.

In January 1987, the Hong Kong government announced plans to demolish the walled city. After an arduous eviction process, and the transfer of de jure sovereignty of the enclave from China to Britain, demolition began in March 1993 and was completed in April 1994. Kowloon Walled City Park opened in December 1995 and occupies the area of the former walled city. Some historical artefacts from the walled city, including its yamen building and remnants of its southern gate, have been preserved there.

History

Military outpost

The history of the walled city can be traced back to the Song dynasty (960–1279), when a military outpost was set up to manage the salt trade in the area. Little took place for hundreds of years afterward, although 30 guards were stationed there in 1668. A small coastal fort was established around 1810 after Chinese forces abandoned Tung Lung Fort. In 1842, during Qing Emperor Daoguang's reign, Hong Kong Island was ceded to Britain by the Treaty of Nanking. As a result, the Qing authorities felt it necessary to improve the fort to rule the area and check further British influence. The improvements, including the formidable defensive wall, were completed in 1847. The walled city was captured by rebels during the Taiping Rebellion in 1854, before being retaken a few weeks later. The present walled city's "Dapeng Association House" forms the remnants of what was previously Lai Enjue's garrison.

The Convention for the Extension of Hong Kong Territory of 1898 handed additional parts of Hong Kong (the New Territories) to Britain for 99 years, but excluded the walled city, which at the time had a population of roughly 700. China was allowed to continue to keep officials there as long as they did not interfere with the defence of British Hong Kong. The following year, the governor, Sir Henry Blake, suspected that the viceroy of Canton was using troops to aid resistance to the new arrangements. On 14 April 1899, British forces attacked the walled city, only to find the viceroy's soldiers gone, leaving behind only the mandarin and 150 residents. The Qing dynasty ended its rule in 1912, leaving the walled city to the British.

Though the British claimed ownership of the walled city, they did little with it over the following few decades. The Protestant church established an old people's home in the old "yamen" (Chinese administrative office) as well as a school and an almshouse in other former offices. Aside from such institutions, however, the walled city became a mere curiosity for British colonials and tourists to visit; it was labelled as "Chinese Town" in a 1915 map. In 1933, the Hong Kong authorities announced plans to demolish most of the decaying walled city's buildings, compensating the 436 squatters that lived there with new homes. That same year in 1933, the Nationalist Chinese government protested against the plan, and claimed jurisdiction over the city. The Nationalist Chinese government continued to make claims on its jurisdiction throughout 1935, 1936, and the first half of 1937, until the war between China and Japan started.

By 1940, only the yamen, the school, and one house remained. During the World War II occupation of Hong Kong, the Japanese occupying forces demolished the city's wall and used the stone to expand the nearby Kai Tak Airport.

Urban settlement

After Japan's surrender in 1945, China announced its intent to reclaim the walled city. In November 1946, Nationalist Chinese officials created the "Draft Outline Plan for Reinstatement of Administration" of the area, which included an office, schools, police, and other functions. Refugees fleeing the Chinese Civil War post-1945 poured into Hong Kong, and 2,000 squatters occupied the walled city by 1947. After a failed attempt to drive them out in 1948, the British adopted a 'hands-off' policy in most matters concerning the walled city. On 8 January 1948, the Nationalist Chinese government sent a memorandum to the British Ambassador, stating "The Ministry of Foreign Affairs now formally declare to the British Embassy that, in accordance with the provisions of the said Convention, the Chinese Government enjoys jurisdiction over the City of Kowloon and that they have no intention whatsoever of renouncing this jurisdiction." The British Foreign Office, on 4 February 1948, considered a variety of solutions (including turning the site into a Nationalist Chinese Consulate-General), and ultimately recommended that the British "accept the principle of Chinese jurisdiction over Kowloon Walled City but the Chinese agree not to attempt to exercise that jurisdiction in practice." Additionally, the British Foreign Office said that "A public garden controlled by the municipal authorities of Kowloon Leased territory offers such a solution and so would a Chinese consular compound, if the Chinese could first be induced to agree in principle to the appointment of a Consul General."

In January 1950, a fire broke out that destroyed over 2,500 huts, home to nearly 3,500 families and 17,000 total people. The disaster highlighted the need for proper fire prevention in the largely wooden-built squatter areas, complicated by the lack of political ties with the colonial and Chinese governments. The ruins gave new arrivals to the walled city the opportunity to build anew, causing speculation that the fire may have been intentionally set.

With no government enforcement from the Chinese or the British aside from a few raids by the Royal Hong Kong Police, the walled city became a haven for crime and drugs. It was only during a 1959 trial for a murder that occurred within the walled city that the Hong Kong government was ruled to have jurisdiction there. By that time, however, the walled city was virtually ruled by the organised crime syndicates known as triads.

Beginning in the 1950s, triad groups such as the 14K and Sun Yee On gained a stranglehold on the walled city's numerous brothels, gaming parlours, and opium dens. The walled city had become such a haven for criminals that police would venture into it only in large groups. With public support, particularly from younger residents, the continued raids gradually eroded drug use and violent crime. In 1983, the district police commander declared the walled city's crime rate to be under control.

The city also underwent massive construction during the 1960s, with developers building new modular structures above older ones. As a result, the city reached its maximum size by the late 1970s and early 1980s; a height restriction of 13 to 14 storeys had been imposed on the city due to the flight path of planes heading toward Kai Tak Airport. As well as limiting building height, the proximity of the airport subjected residents to serious noise pollution. Eight municipal pipes provided water to the entire structure, although more could have come from wells. A few of the streets were illuminated by fluorescent lights, as sunlight rarely reached the lower levels due to the outstanding disregard to air rights within the city. Although the rampant crime of earlier decades diminished in later years, the walled city was still known for its high number of unlicensed doctors and dentists who could operate there without threat of prosecution.

Although the walled city was for many years a hotbed of criminal activity, most residents were not involved in any crime and lived peacefully within its walls. Numerous small factories and businesses thrived inside the walled city, and some residents formed groups to organise and improve daily life there. An attempt by the government in 1963 to demolish some shacks in a corner of the city gave rise to an "anti-demolition committee" that served as the basis for a kaifong association. Charities, religious societies, and other welfare groups were gradually introduced to the city. While medical clinics and schools went unregulated, the Hong Kong government provided some services such as water supply and mail delivery.

Eviction and demolition

The quality of life in the city—sanitary conditions in particular—remained far behind the rest of Hong Kong. The Sino-British Joint Declaration in 1984 laid the groundwork for the city's demolition. The mutual decision by the two governments to tear down the walled city was announced on 14 January 1987. On 10 March 1987, following the announcement that the walled city would be converted to a park, the Secretary for District Administration formally requested the Urban Council to take over the site following demolition. Owing to the presence of numerous other green spaces in the area, the Urban Services Department doubted the need for "yet another park" from a planning and operations point of view, but the council agreed nonetheless to accept the government's proposal on the condition that the government bear the cost of park construction.

Some residents were not satisfied with the compensation and were forcibly evicted between November 1991 and July 1992. While it was deserted, the empty city was used to film a scene in the 1993 movie Crime Story.

After four months of planning, demolition of the walled city began on 23 March 1993 and concluded in April 1994. Construction work on Kowloon Walled City Park started the following month.

Current status as park

Design and construction
The area where the walled city once stood is now Kowloon Walled City Park, adjacent to Carpenter Road Park. The  park was completed in August 1995 and handed over to the Urban Council. It was opened officially by Governor Chris Patten a few months later on 22 December.

The park's design is modelled on Jiangnan gardens of the early Qing dynasty. It is divided into eight landscape features, with the fully restored yamen as its centrepiece. The park's paths and pavilions are named after streets and buildings in the walled city. Artefacts from the walled city, such as five inscribed stones and three old wells, are also on display in the park. The park was designed by the Architectural Services Department, which won a "prestigious award" from the Central Society of Horticulture of Germany for the redevelopment.

Components of the park include:
 The Eight Floral Walks, each named after a different plant or flower
 The Chess Garden, featuring four  Chinese chessboards
 The Garden of Chinese zodiac, containing stone statues of the 12 Chinese zodiac animals
 The Garden of Four Seasons (named Guangyin Square after the small open area in the walled city), a  garden with plants that symbolise the four seasons
 The Six Arts Terrace, a  wedding area containing a garden and the Bamboo Pavilion
 The Kuixing Pavilion, including a moon gate framed by two stone tablets and the towering Guibi Rock, which represents Hong Kong's return to China
 The Mountain View Pavilion, a two-storey structure resembling a docked boat that provides a good view of the entire park
 The Lung Tsun, Yuk Tong, and Lung Nam Pavilions
 The yamen and the remains of the South Gate (see below).

Declared monuments

The Antiquities and Monuments Office conducted archaeological examinations as the walled city was being demolished, and several cultural remains were discovered. Among them were the walled city's yamen and remnants of its South Gate, which were officially designated declared monuments of Hong Kong on 4 October 1996.

The South Gate had originally served as the walled city's main entrance. Along with its foundation, other remains included two stone plaques inscribed with "South Gate" and "Kowloon Walled City" from the South Gate and a flagstone path that had led up to it. The foundations of the city's wall and East Gate were also discovered. The Hong Kong government preserved the South Gate remnants next to a square in front of the yamen.

The yamen building is made up of three halls. Originally the middle hall served the Assistant Magistrate of Kowloon's administrative office, and the rear block was his residence. After the government officials left the area in 1899, it was used for several other purposes, including an old people's home, a refuge for widows and orphans, a school, and a clinic. It was restored in 1996 and is now found near the centre of the park. It contains a photo gallery of the walled city, and two cannon dating back to 1802 sit at the sides of its entrance.

The city before demolition

Layout and architecture

The walled city was located in what became known as the Kowloon City area of Kowloon. In spite of its transformation from a fort into an urban enclave, the walled city retained the same basic layout.

Construction surged dramatically during the 1960s and 1970s, until the formerly low-rise city consisted almost entirely of buildings with 10 storeys or more (with the notable exception of the yamen in its centre). The two-storey Sai Tau Tsuen settlement bordered the walled city to the south and west until it was cleared in 1985 and replaced with Carpenter Road Park.

An informal network of staircases and passageways also formed on upper levels, which was so extensive that one could travel north to south through the entire city without ever touching solid ground. Construction in the city went unregulated, and most of the roughly 350 buildings were built with poor foundations and few or no utilities. Because apartments were so small—a typical unit was —space was maximised with wider upper floors, caged balconies and rooftop additions. Roofs in the city were full of television antennas, clothes lines, water tanks, and rubbish, and could be crossed using a series of ladders.

Demography

Kowloon Walled City's early population fluctuated between zero and a few hundred, and began growing steadily shortly after World War II. However, there is no accurate population information available for much of the walled city's later existence. Official census numbers estimated the walled city's population at 10,004 in 1971 and 14,617 in 1981, but these figures were commonly considered to be much too low. Informal estimates, on the other hand, often mistakenly included the neighbouring squatter village of Sai Tau Tsuen. Population figures of about 50,000 were also reported.

A thorough government survey in 1987 gave a clearer picture: an estimated 33,000 people resided within the walled city.

Names in the Kowloon Walled City were mostly Cantonese, like the rest of Hong Kong at the time.

Culture

In response to difficult living conditions, residents formed a tightly knit community, helping one another endure various hardships. Within families, wives often did housekeeping, while grandmothers cared for their grandchildren and other children from surrounding households. The city's rooftops were important gathering places, especially for residents who lived on upper floors. Parents used them to relax, and children would play or do homework there after school.

The yamen in the heart of the city was also a major social centre, a place for residents to talk, have tea or watch television, and to take classes such as calligraphy. The Old People's Centre also held religious meetings for Christians and others. Other religious institutions included the Fuk Tak and Tin Hau temples, which were used for a combination of Buddhist, Taoist, and animist practices.

Cultural memory
A lack of governance and separation from Hong Kong provided a distinct culture in the city.  Crime was high and corruption as high; the police were known to co-operate with the triads operating in the city.  During the 1970s greater police presence reduced crime and the city became home to those seeking to avoid business regulation and taxes.

While the city was shunned in its early existence, it has since become a source of pride for many Hong Kong residents. The rising publicity around Hong Kong following the 1997 handover sparked a re-emergence in the public interest of Kowloon Walled City and its disappearance. Popular memory tends to sanitise the city, forgetting the crime and corruption. The city has begun to be portrayed with a romantic dystopian identity, and many forms of modern media have borrowed the city's culture in their works.

In popular culture

Films

Many authors, filmmakers, game designers, and visual artists have used the walled city to convey a sense of oppressive urbanisation or unfettered criminality. In literature, Robert Ludlum's novel The Bourne Supremacy uses the walled city as one of its settings. The city appears as a virtual reality environment (described by Steven Poole as an "oasis of political and creative freedom") in William Gibson's Bridge trilogy, and as a contrast with Singapore in his Wired article "Disneyland with the Death Penalty". In the manga Crying Freeman, the titular character's wife travels to the walled city to master her swordsmanship and control a cursed sword. The manga Blood+: Kowloon Nights uses the walled city as the setting for a series of murders. The walled city finds an extensive mention in Doctor Robin Cook's 1991 novel Vital Signs. The filth, squalor and the crime-oriented nature of the area is described vividly when the characters Marissa and Tristan Williams pass by the back-lanes. The later part of episode 3 and episode 4 of the anime Street Fighter II V are set in the Kowloon Walled City, depicted as a dark and lawless area where Ryu, Ken and Chun-Li have to fight for their lives at every turn, being rescued by the police once they reach the walled city's limits.

The 1982 Shaw Brothers film Brothers from the Walled City is set in Kowloon Walled City. The 1984 gangster film Long Arm of the Law features the walled city as a refuge for gang members before they are gunned down by police. In the 1988 film Bloodsport, starring Jean-Claude Van Damme, the walled city is the setting for a martial arts tournament. The 1992 non-narrative film Baraka features several highly detailed shots of the walled city shortly before its demolition. The 1993 film Crime Story starring Jackie Chan was partly filmed in the deserted walled city, and includes real scenes of building explosions. A walled neighbourhood called the Narrows in the 2005 film Batman Begins was inspired by the walled city. The 2006 Hong Kong horror film Re-cycle features a decrepit, nightmarish version of the walled city, complete with tortured souls from which the protagonist must flee. The 2016 TVB martial arts drama A Fist Within Four Walls takes place in the triad-ridden walled city in the early 1960s.

Memoirs and autobiographies
A few of the people who spent time in Kowloon Walled City have written accounts of their experiences. Evangelist Jackie Pullinger wrote a 1989 memoir, Crack in the Wall, about her involvement in treating drug addicts within the walled city. In his 2004 autobiography Gweilo, Martin Booth describes his exploration of the walled city as a child in the 1950s. Gordon Jones, a District Officer of Kowloon City District at the time also published his recollections of the city during his time in office.

Video games
Kowloon Walled City is depicted in several games, including Kowloon's Gate and Shenmue II. The game Stranglehold, a sequel to the film Hard Boiled, features a version of the walled city filled with hundreds of Triad members. In the games Fear Effect and Fear Effect 2, photographs of the walled city were used as inspiration "for moods, camera angles and lighting." Concept art for the MMORPG Guild Wars Factions depicts massive, densely packed structures inspired by the walled city. The pen-and-paper RPG Shadowrun and CRPG Shadowrun: Hong Kong include a crime-ridden, rebuilt version of the Walled City set in 2056. The walled city also features in the 2010 game Call of Duty: Black Ops. The 2022 video game Stray's environment is influenced by the walled city as well.

Amusement arcade
A partial recreation of the Kowloon Walled City existed in the Warehouse Kawasaki, an amusement arcade that operated from 2009 to 2019 in the Japanese suburb of Kawasaki, Kanagawa. The atmosphere of the walled city was reflected in the arcade's narrow corridors, electrical wires, pipes, postboxes, sign boards, neon lights, frayed posters, and various other small touches.

See also

 History of Hong Kong
 Lung Tsun Stone Bridge
 Nan Lian Garden
 Tung Wah Group of Hospitals Museum
 List of buildings and structures in Hong Kong
 List of urban public parks and gardens in Hong Kong
 Terra nullius
 Bir Tawil; Halaib Triangle
 Saudi-Iraqi neutral zone (1922-1991)
 Kamagasaki in Osaka, Japan
 Vele di Scampia, in Naples, Italy
 Centro Financiero Confinanzas, an abandoned skyscraper populated in a similar manner
 Ras Khamis, a neighbourhood in East Jerusalem that also has unplanned highrise construction due to uncertain political jurisdiction
 Dharavi, a densely populated community within Mumbai which has developed a similar localised economy and unplanned infrastructure system.
 Treasure Hill, formerly an illegal settlement in Taipei founded by Chinese Nationalist military veterans at the end of the 1940s.

References

Citations

Sources

Further reading

Books and research papers

 City of Darkness: Revisited, by Ian Lambot (writer, photographer) and Greg Girard (photographer), published by Watermark, 2014,  (revised edition of City of Darkness)
 , by Ian Lambot (writer, photographer) and Greg Girard (photographer), published by EastPress, 2004,  (Japanese edition of City of Darkness)
 , by the Kyūryūjō Tankentai (the "Kowloon Walled City Exploration Team"), including Hitomi Terasawa (illustrator), Takayuki Suzuki (architect) and Hiroaki Kani (supervisor), published by Iwanami Shoten, 1997, 
 , by Ryūji Miyamoto (photographer), Hiroshi Aramata (text contributor) and Ken'ichi Ōhashi (text contributor), published by Heibonsha, 1997, ; Heibonsha, 1998, ; Heibonsha, 1999, 
 , by Shintarō Nakamura, published by Shinpusha, 1996, 
 An Architectural Study on the Kowloon Walled City: Preliminary Findings, by Suenn Ho, published by Columbia University, 1992
 Jiulong Cheng Zhai shihua, by Lu Jinzhe, published by Joint Publishing, 1997, 
 , by Wong Kwan-yiu et al., published by the Chinese University of Hong Kong – Department of Geography, 1992
 FARMAX: Excursions on Density, by Winy Maas, Jacob van Rijs and Richard Koek (main contributors), published by 010 Publishers, 1998, ; 010 Publishers, 2006,

Documentary films

 The Walled City, as part of Hong Kong Connection's 70th segment, produced by Radio Television Hong Kong (RTHK), 1979
 Hongkongs geheime Stadt – Ein Labyrinth für 50.000 Menschen ("Hong Kong's Secret City: A Labyrinth for 50,000 People"), produced by Hugo Portisch of the public Austrian Broadcasting Corporation (ORF), 1989
 Kowloon Walled City, as part of Whicker's World, produced by ITV Yorkshire, 1980
 City of Imagination: Kowloon Walled City 20 Years Later (archive footage by ORF and Suenn Ho), produced by The Wall Street Journal, 2014

External links

  for Kowloon Walled City Park, Leisure and Cultural Services Department (LCSD).

Unofficial analyses:
A team's exploration of the City before demolition
Historical, architectural and political overview
Kowloon Walled City life (South China Morning Post article)
Kowloon Walled City project, Wall Street Journal
Rare Maps Show Life in Hong Kong's Vice-Filled 'Walled City'
“Dark tower of dreams: Inside the Walled City of Kowloon”, CBC Ideas. CBC Radio One. 18 October 2017. (Retrieved 12 July 2018.)
"The Strange Saga of Kowloon Walled City" Atlas Obscura. 06 January 2020 (Retrieved 24 September 2022.)

Forts in Hong Kong
Declared monuments of Hong Kong
Archaeological sites in Hong Kong
Landmarks in Hong Kong
Demolished buildings and structures in China
Kowloon City
New Kowloon
Former populated places in China
Former buildings and structures in Hong Kong
Territorial disputes of the Republic of China
Slums in Asia
Former enclaves
Triad (organized crime)
Disputed territories in Asia
Territorial disputes of the United Kingdom
Evicted squats
City-states
Former squats
Squats